The following is a list of events affecting American television in 2017. Events listed include television show debuts, finales, and cancellations; channel launches, closures, and re-brandings; stations changing or adding their network affiliations; and information about controversies and carriage disputes.

Notable events

January

February

March

April

May

June

July

August

September

October

November

December

Awards

Television programs

Programs debuting in 2017

Miniseries

Television films and specials 
{| class="wikitable"
! First aired
! Title
! Channel
! Source
|-
|January 12
|Taking the Stage: African American Music and Stories That Changed America
|ABC
|
|-
|January 16
|Rufus 2
|Nickelodeon
|
|-
|February 7
|Michael Bolton's Big, Sexy Valentine's Day Special
|Netflix
|
|-
|May 7
|The Last 100 Days of Diana
|rowspan=2|ABC
|
|-
|May 24
|Dirty Dancing
|
|-
|June 4
|Ariana Grande's One Love Manchester Benefit Concert Live
|ABC/Freeform
|
|-
|July 21
|Descendants 2
|Disney Channel
|
|-
|August 6
|Sharknado 5: Global Swarming
|Syfy
|
|-
|August 12
|Jojo Siwa: My World
|rowspan=2|Nickelodeon
|
|-
|October 9
|Escape from Mr. Lemoncello's Library
|
|-
|October 27
|Michael Jackson's Halloween
|CBS
|
|-
|November 11
|The Magical Wand Chase
|HBO
|-
|November 21
|Beat Bugs: All Together Now
|Netflix
|
|-
|rowspan="2"|November 24
|Trolls Holiday
|NBC
|
|-
|Hey Arnold!: The Jungle Movie
|Nickelodeon
|
|-
|November 26
|A Very Merry Toy Store
|Lifetime
|
|-
|November 27
|Angry Angel
|Freeform
|
|-
|November 30
|The Wonderful World of Disney: Magical Holiday Celebration
|ABC
|
|-
|December 1
|DreamWorks Home for the Holidays
|Netflix
|
|-
|December 2
|Tiny Christmas
|Nickelodeon
|
|-
|December 7
|Psych: The Movie
|USA Network
|
|-
| December 14
| Olaf's Frozen Adventure
| ABC
|
|-
|December 17
|A Christmas Story Live!
|Fox
|
|}

Programs changing networks

Programs returning in 2017
The following shows returned with new episodes or reruns after being canceled or having ended their run previously:

Milestone episodes

Programs ending in 2017

Entering syndication this year
A list of programs (current or canceled) that have accumulated enough episodes (between 65 and 100) or seasons (three or more) to be eligible for off-network syndication and/or basic cable runs.

Networks and services

Network launches

Network conversions

Network closures

Television stations

Station launches

Stations changing network affiliation

Station spectrum transitions

Station closures

Deaths

Notes

References

External links
List of 2017 American television series at IMDb

 
American television
Spectrum auctions